Angels Embrace is the eighth studio album by English singer, songwriter, and musician Jon Anderson, released in September 1995 by Higher Octave Music.

Background
Following the release of his previous album, Change We Must, in October 1994, Anderson took a break after touring with the rock band Yes before he started to write and record music for a new album. By 1995, Anderson had met his future wife Jane Luttenberger who became a significant inspiration to his life and the music he would write since the mid-1990s. A photograph of the couple is included on the album's liner notes.

Angels Embrace was recorded in 1995 with Anderson as producer, and mixed at Opio Studios in Pacific Palisades, Los Angeles. In a departure from his previous work, the album sees Anderson explore instrumental and ambient music. He had wanted to compose a "peaceful work" for some time, which "plays quietly and embraces the whole room", and used several pieces of musical ideas that he had written and collected over the years as inspiration. Anderson named the album after a pastel painting by English artist Jack Shalatain titled "The Angels Embrace". His daughters Deborah and Jade provide additional vocals, and additional keyboards are performed by Steve Katz and Keith Heffner.

Track listing

Personnel 
Credits adapted from the album's sleeve notes.

Music
Jon Anderson – vocals, keyboards (except "New Eire Land" and "Prayersong")
Deborah Anderson – vocals on "Angels Embrace"
Jade Anderson – vocals on "Prayersong"
Steve Katz – keyboards on "New Eire Land"
Keith Heffner – keyboards on "Prayersong"

Production
Jon Anderson – production
Ric Wilson – mastering
John Laraio – mastering assistant
Tal Herzberg – mastering assistant
Matt Marshall – executive producer
Dan Selene – executive producer
Suki Sir Tansey – creative direction
Geoff Gans – art direction
V Photo/Vitor Martins – photography

References

1995 albums
Jon Anderson albums